Gbeneme Friday (born 28 January 1985) is a Nigerian footballer who plays as a forward for Villa 2000 in the Liga Indonesia Premier Division. He also holds Indonesian citizenship.

Career

Mumbai
Friday signed for Mumbai F.C. from Indonesian club, Persih Tembilahan in 2011. On 14 April 2012 Friday scored four goals for Mumbai against HAL SC in an I-League game at the Bangalore Football Stadium, giving Mumbai the 5–1 victory which helped them during there fight to survive relegation to the I-League 2nd Division.

Shillong Lajong
Gbeneme signed for Shillong Lajong for the season 2012–13.

Villa 2000
He signed for Villa 2000 on 6 April 2014.

Career statistics

Club
Statistics accurate as of 19 April 2012

References

External links
 

1985 births
Living people
Nigerian footballers
Nigerian expatriate sportspeople in India
Nigerian expatriates in Indonesia
I-League players
Mumbai FC players
Expatriate footballers in India
Expatriate footballers in Indonesia
Association football forwards
Indonesian expatriate sportspeople in India